Avanhard Stadium was a multi-purpose stadium in Luhansk, Ukraine. The stadium held 22,288 people.

History
The stadium was built in 1951 as the Kliment Voroshilov Stadium. In 1957, the stadium's capacity was 7,447. It was not until 1961 when it was renamed into Avanhard (Avangard) Stadium. In 1967, the Avanhard Stadium could hold 40,000 spectators. In 1974, there were installed running tracks. In 1986, due to modernization, the stadium's capacity was reduced to 32,243. In 2002, the stadium ownership has changed when it was transferred from Luhanskteplovoz to the Luhansk Oblast Administration. In 2003, there were conducted major renovations to the stadium's facilities, because of that its capacity was reduced to 22,288. In 2011, there was replaced the turf, installed drainage and heat systems.

Late July 2014, the stadium was damaged by a mortar attack during the 2014 insurgency in Donbass.

References

External links

 Информационный сайт болельщиков ФК Заря Луганск. ПАНОРАМА
 Avanhard Stadium at the Our Luhansk football portal.
 Stadium Guide information

Football venues in Ukraine
Sport in Luhansk
Multi-purpose stadiums in Ukraine
Buildings and structures in Luhansk
FC Zorya Luhansk
Avanhard (sports society)
Sports venues in Luhansk Oblast